Lukáš Dvořák (born 30 January 1984) is a Czech football player who currently plays for Ústí nad Labem.

References

External links
 

1984 births
Living people
Czech footballers
Czech First League players
FK Teplice players
FK Ústí nad Labem players

Association football defenders